The 1963–64 Weber State Wildcats men's basketball team represented Weber State College during the 1963–64 NCAA University Division basketball season. In the inaugural year of the Big Sky Conference, the Wildcats were led by fourth-year head coach Dick Motta and played their home games on campus at Wildcat Gym in Ogden, Utah.

References

External links
Sports Reference – Weber State Wildcats: 1963–64 basketball season
2015–16 Media Guide: 1963–64 season

Weber State Wildcats men's basketball seasons
Weber State